Balázs Adolf (born 5 September 1999) is a Hungarian sprint canoeist.

He won a medal at the 2019 ICF Canoe Sprint World Championships.

References

External links

1999 births
Living people
Hungarian male canoeists
ICF Canoe Sprint World Championships medalists in Canadian
Canoeists from Budapest
Canoeists at the 2020 Summer Olympics
Olympic canoeists of Hungary
21st-century Hungarian people